The International Committee of the Decorative Laminates Industry aisbl (ICDLI) is an association with its head office in Brussels.The ICDLI is the international representation of the European HPL manufacturers and their suppliers.

The ICDLI aims at creating a strong and successful European community of the manufacturers as well as at the continuation of the success story of high-pressure laminates.

The ICDLI is an associate member of the Council of European Producers of Materials for Construction (CEPMC).

History 
The International Committee of the Decorative Laminates Industry (ICDLI) was founded in 1961 by laminates associations from Belgium, France and Germany. Over the course of the following years associations from Austria, Finland, the Netherlands, Norway, Sweden, Switzerland and Spain also joined.

Since 1999 the ICDLI has been an association established under Belgian law and has had its official Head Office in Brussels.

In 2000 the status of the ICDLI was changed from that of an umbrella association to an association with individual member companies.

Tasks 
The ICDLI with its Technical, Public Relations and Economic Commissions performs the following tasks:
continuation of the European laminates standard EN 438
initialisation of data concerning the European HPL industry
preparing of information concerning the product and environmental features of HPL
dissolving of technical problems
creating a communication platform for the manufacturers and their suppliers

Members 
  Asd Laminat
 Abet Laminati
 Argolite AG
 Arpa Industriale S.p.A.
  Formica Group
Gentas Genel Metal Sanayi Ticaret S.A.
Lemark 
Ludwig Leitermann GmbH & Co. KG
Modecor Europe GmbH
Pfleiderer Deutschland 
Polyrey SA
Resopal GmbH
JSC Slotex
Sonae Industria de Revestimentos
Sprela GmbH

Associate members 
Cartiera Giacosa
Hans Schmid GmbH & Co. KG
Hexion
KapStone Europe sprl.
Kotkamills Oy
Munksjö Paper GmbH
Papierfabrik Julius Schulte Söhne GmbH & Co. KG
Sappi Europe
Schattdecor AG
Surteco Decor

References

External links 
 www.icdli.com
 Information about European Standards

International trade associations